Josh Newman may refer to:

 Josh Newman (politician) (born 1964), American politician
 Josh Newman (baseball) (born 1982), American baseball player